The Voyage 12.5 is a French sailboat that was designed by Guy Ribadeau Dumas as a cruiser and first built in 1987.

The Voyage 12.5 design was developed into the Sun Odyssey 42 in 1990.

Production
The design was built by Jeanneau in France, starting in 1987, but it is now out of production.

Design
The Voyage 12.5 is a recreational keelboat, built predominantly of fiberglass, with wood trim. It has a masthead sloop rig. The hull has a raked stem, a step-equipped reverse transom, a skeg-mounted rudder controlled by a wheel and a fixed fin keel. It displaces  and carries  of ballast.

The design has sleeping accommodation for six people, with a double "V"-berth in the bow cabin and two aft cabins, each with a double berth. There are two main cabin arrangements, one with a round table to starboard and the galley to port and the other with a "U" shaped settee to port around a rectangular table and the gallery to starboard. In both arrangements the galley is equipped with a four-burner stove, an ice box and a double sink. A navigation station on the starboard side. There are two heads, one just aft of the bow cabin on the starboard side and one on the port side just forward of the aft cabins.

See also
List of sailing boat types

References

External links

Photo of a Voyage 12.5 showing the transom
Photo of a Voyage 12.5 showing the bow

Keelboats
1980s sailboat type designs
Sailing yachts
Sailboat type designs by Guy Ribadeau Dumas
Sailboat types built by Jeanneau